Jirawat Kaewboran (Thai จิรวัฒน์ แก้วโบราณ) is a Thai retired footballer.

References

1981 births
Living people
Jirawat Kaewboran
Association football forwards
Jirawat Kaewboran
Jirawat Kaewboran